Harly John Wise is an English professional footballer who last played as a defender for Hendon; he departed League Two side Hartlepool United in February 2017. He was previously a player at Queens Park Rangers.

Playing career
Wise came through the youth team at Queens Park Rangers to turn professional in March 2014. He was released by Queens Park Rangers at the end of the 2015–16 season. After a spell at Hemel Hempstead Town, he signed for Hartlepool United in October 2016, following a successful trial the previous month. He made his senior debut as a half-time substitute for Matthew Bates in a 2–1 defeat to Rochdale in an EFL Trophy group match at Victoria Park on 9 November 2016. Wise was released by Hartlepool on 20 February 2017 after his short-term contract expired. He signed for Dulwich Hamlet in March 2017. Wise joined Hayes & Yeading for the 2017–18 season. Wise signed for Hendon in October 2017.

Statistics

References

External links
 Harly Wise - Profile - Aylesbury United
 Harly Wise - Dulwich Hamlet F.C.

1996 births
Living people
English footballers
Association football defenders
Footballers from Hammersmith
Queens Park Rangers F.C. players
Hartlepool United F.C. players
English Football League players
Hemel Hempstead Town F.C. players
Dulwich Hamlet F.C. players
Hayes & Yeading United F.C. players
Hendon F.C. players